Dendrobium gracilicaule, commonly known as the blotched cane orchid or yellow cane orchid, is an epiphytic or lithophytic orchid in the family Orchidaceae. It has cylindrical pseudobulbs, between three and seven thin leaves and up to thirty often drooping, cream-coloured to yellow or greenish flowers, sometimes with reddish brown blotches on the back. There are two varieties, one occurring in Queensland and New South Wales and the other on some Pacific Islands, including Lord Howe Island.

Description 
The side lobes curve upwards and the middle lobe is kidney-shaped and has three wavy ridges. Flowering occurs between July and September.

Taxonomy and naming
Dendrobium gracilicaule was first formally described in 1859 by Ferdinand von Mueller and the description was published in Fragmenta phytographiae Australiae from a specimen collected by William Hill near Moreton Bay. The specific epithet (gracilicaule) is derived from the Latin words gracilis meaning "slender" or "thin" and caulis meaning "stem" or "stalk".

There are two varieties of this orchid:
 Dendrobium gracilicaule var. gracilicaule – the blotched cane orchid which has large reddish brown blotches on the back of the flowers  and grows on trees or rocks usually in rainforest between Mount Fox in Queensland and the Hawkesbury River in New South Wales.
 Dendrobium gracilicaule var. howeanum Maiden – the yellow cane orchid, which lacks spots on the back of the flowers and grows in humid forests on Lord Howe Island, the Kermadec Islands, Fiji, New Caledonia and Vanuatu.

References

External links
IOSPE orchid photos, Dendrobium gracilicaule
Santa Barbara Orchid Estate (Santa Barbara California USA), Dendrobium gracilicaule
Australian Native Orchid Society (Queensland), Kabi Group, Dendrobium gracilicaule

gracilicaule
Orchids of Oceania
Orchids of New Caledonia
Orchids of New South Wales
Orchids of Queensland
Flora of Lord Howe Island
Flora of Fiji
Flora of the Kermadec Islands
Flora of Vanuatu
Plants described in 1859
Taxa named by Ferdinand von Mueller